The Hotak is a tribe of the Ghilji confederacy of the Pashtun people.

Hotak may also refer to:
 Hotak (surname)
 Hotak dynasty, an 18th-century Afghan monarchy

See also
 Hotak v London Borough of Southwark
 Hotaka (disambiguation)